Subhadra Pradhan (born 5 June 1986) is an Indian field hockey player.

Early life
Subhadra Pradhan was born on 5 June 1986 in Saunamara, a small town in Odisha to an Adivasi family. She did schooling in Birsa Munda school and pre-university education in Khalsa College, Patiala. She tutored at the Panposh Hockey Hostel at Rourkela during her initial days and started her career in hockey in 1997.

Career
Subhadra Pradhan was included in India's junior team in 2000 and she led the junior team to a third-place finish at the Junior Asia Cup in October/November 2004. She made her senior debut in 2003. She was a part of the senior team that won the gold medal in the 2004 Asia Cup and the silver medal at the 2006 Commonwealth Games. In 2007, Subhadra Pradhan along with Jasjeet Kaur became the first Indian women to play for a European club, when they played for the Dutch club HC Den Bosch in 2007. She was awarded the 'Player of the Tournament' in the 2009 Asia Cup that India finished second.

Personal life
Subhadra Pradhan married Pradeep Naik in April 2009. She is employed with the South Eastern Railway and is currently stationed in Ranchi.

Awards and honours
In 2006, she was given the Ekalavya Award for her contribution to Indian hockey.

References

External links
Profile at Bharatiyahockey

1986 births
Living people
Indian female field hockey players
21st-century Indian women
21st-century Indian people
Asian Games bronze medalists for India
Asian Games medalists in field hockey
Commonwealth Games medallists in field hockey
Commonwealth Games silver medallists for India
Field hockey players at the 2006 Asian Games
Field hockey players at the 2010 Asian Games
Field hockey players from Odisha
Medalists at the 2006 Asian Games
Recipients of the Ekalavya Award
Sportswomen from Odisha
Field hockey players at the 2006 Commonwealth Games
HC Den Bosch players
Medallists at the 2006 Commonwealth Games